The following is a list of Poets who wrote or write much of their poetry in the languages of China.



A
Ai Qing

B
Bai Juyi or Bo Juyi
Consort Ban
Ban Gu (32–92 A.D.)
Bei Dao
Bei Ling
Bian Zhilin

C
 Cai Wenji
 Cai Yong
 Cao Cao 曹操
 Cao Pi
 Cao Zhi
 Cen Shen
 Chen Sanli
 Chen Yinke
 Chen Zi'ang
 Chūgan Engetsu (1300–1375), Japanese poet who wrote in Chinese, a figure in "Japanese Literature of the Five Mountains" (literature in Chinese written in Japan)
 Cui Hao, Tang dynasty poet

D
 Dai Biaoyuan
 Dai Wangshu
 Dong Xiaowan
 Du Fu 杜甫, the "Poet Sage"
 Du Mu (803-852), Tang poet, official
 Duo Duo

E

 Emperor Xuanzong of Tang

F
Fei Ye 菲野
Fenggan, "Big Stick", a legendary Buddhist Monk. He was an associate of the famous legendary poets Han Shan and Shih Te.

G
 Gao Qi, Ming dynasty poet
 Gidō Shūshin
 Gong Zizhen
 Gu Cheng
 Gu Taiqing
 Guan Daosheng
 Guo Moruo, poet, historian, archaeologist

H
Hai Zi 海子, modern mystic poet
Han Yu 韩愈
Han Shan, "Cold Mountain"
He Zhizhang
Huang Tingjian 黄庭堅 (1045–1105)
Huarui Furen
Huang Zongxi

I
Ido Reizan

J
Jao Tsung-I
Jia Dao 贾岛
Jia Yi
Jiang Yan

K
Ke Yan
Kokan Shiren
Kong Shangren

L
Leung Ping-kwan
Li E
Li Bai (Li Po), the "Poet Immortal"
Li He
Li Qiao
Li Qingzhao
Li Shangyin
Li Yu (Li Houzhu)
Liang Desheng
Liang Huang
Lin Huiyin
Liu Yuxi
Liu Zongyuan
Lu Guimong
Lu Ji
Lu You
Lu Yu
Lu Zhaolin
Lu Zhi
Luo Binwang

M
Ma Rong
Mang Ke
Mao Zedong
Mei Yaochen, Song dynasty poet
Meng Haoran, Tang dynasty poet
Mi Heng
Mu Dan

N
 Natsume Sōseki, Japan's modern composer of Chinese poetry
 Nalan Xingde
 Nie Gannu

O
 Ouyang Xiu

P
Pan Yue
Pan Lei
Pei Di
Pi Rixiu

Q
Qian Zhongshu
Qiu Jin
Qiu Wei
Qu Yuan, State of Chu poet
Quan Deyu
Qiao Ji

R
Ruan Ji

S
 Shangguan Wan'er（上官婉儿）
 Shen Shanbao（沈善宝）
 Shen Yue（沈约）
 Shen Quanqi（沈佺期）
 Shi Zhi"index finger"（食指，郭路生）
 Shih-Te, "Pick-Up"（拾得）
 Shih-wu, "Stonehouse"（石屋）
 Shivaza Iasyr, wrote in the Dungan (Soviet Hui people) dialect（雅斯尔·十娃子 or 亚瑟尔·十娃子）
 Shu Ting（舒婷）
 Sima Xiangru（司马相如）
 Song Yu（宋玉）
 Su Shi （苏轼）
 Su Xiaoxiao（苏小小）
 Shang Ting （商挺）

T
Tao Qian, also known as Tao Yuanming

W
 Wang Anshi
 Wang Bo
 Wang Can
 Wang Changling
 Wang Rong
 Wang Wei (Tang dynasty), the "Poet Buddha"
 Wang Wei (17th-century poet)
 Wang Yi-Ch'eng, poet
 Wang Yun (Qing dynasty)
 Wei Yuan
 Wei Zhuang
 Wen Tingyun
 Wen Yiduo
 Wu Cheng'en, Ming novelist, poet
 Wu Jiaji
 Wu Zao

X
 Xi Chuan
 Xi Kang (or Ji Kang)
 Xi Xi
 Xiao Gang (Emperor Jianwen of Liang)
 Xie Lingyun
 Xie Tiao
 Xin Qiji
 Lady Xu Mu
 Xu Zhi Mo 1895–1931, melancholic poet of early 20th century
 Xu Zihua
 Xue Tao 768-831

Y
Yang Jiong
Yang Lian
Yang Wanli
Yang Xiong
Yao Shouzhong
Yao Sui
John Yau
Chia-ying Yeh
Yu Xin
Yu Xiuhua
Yu Xuanji
Yuan Hongdao
Yuan Zhen
Yuan Zhongdao

Z
Zhai Yongming
Zhang Heng
Zhang Hua
Zhang Ji (poet from Hubei)
Zhang Ji (poet from Jiangnan)
Zhang Jiuling
Zhang Xu
Zhang Yaotiao (Tang courtesan poet)
Zhao Luanluan (Yuan dynasty poet)
Zhao Luorui
Zhang Zhidong
Zheng Min
Zheng Yunduan
Zhu Shuzhen
Zhuo Wenjun
Zuo Si

See also

Chinese poetry
Song Dynasty poets (list)
List of Three Hundred Tang Poems poets
Tang Dynasty poets (list)
List of Chinese authors
List of Chinese women writers
List of Hong Kong poets

Notes

 
Chinese